Vila Pouca may refer to the following places in Portugal:

Vila Pouca da Beira, municipality in the district of Vila Real
Vila Pouca de Aguiar, village and former civil parish in the municipality of Oliveira do Hospital